Kevin Kinney (born 1963) is the Iowa State Senator from the 39th District. A Democrat, he has served in the Iowa Senate since 2015. Kinney is a farmer and a former lieutenant with the Johnson County Sheriff's Office.  He was born and raised in Oxford, Iowa, attending Clear Creek High School. He currently lives just outside of Oxford with his wife Debbie and two children.

As of February 2020, Kinney serves on the following committees: Agriculture (Ranking Member), Judiciary (Ranking Member), Ethics, and Transportation. He also serves on the Agriculture and Natural Resources Appropriations Subcommittee, as well as the International Relations Committee, Connecting Rural Iowa Task Force, Iowa Law Enforcement Academy Council, and the Justice Advisory Board.

Electoral history

References

External links
Legislator website

Democratic Party Iowa state senators
Living people
1963 births
People from Johnson County, Iowa
21st-century American politicians